Ernest Blake (24 March 1895 – 1965) was an English professional footballer who played as a winger.

References

1895 births
1965 deaths
People from Hednesford
English footballers
Association football wingers
Grimsby Rovers F.C. players
Grimsby Town F.C. players
Haycroft Rovers F.C. players
English Football League players